Pierre Frogier (born 16 November 1950, Nouméa, New Caledonia) is a French politician, who was President of the Government of New Caledonia from 2001 to 2004. He has been French senator for New Caledonia since 2011, and was member of the National Assembly of France from 1996 to 2011. He served as President of the Congress of New Caledonia from 1995 to 1997.

He was born in Nouméa.

He was elected President of that collectivity by the territorial Congress (Congrès du territoire) on 5 April 2001, reelected in November 2002 when the government collapsed following the resignation of a minister, and left office on 10 June 2004, when a new government was elected after his party, the anti-independence The Rally–UMP, lost parliamentary elections.

When the new government collapsed, Frogier ran for president in elections two weeks later, on 24 June 2004, in which he was defeated, received 4 of the 11 votes in Congress.

He was elected second time as President of the Congress of New Caledonia from 2007 to 2009.

References

1950 births
Living people
People from Nouméa
Presidents of the Government of New Caledonia
Presidents of the Congress of New Caledonia
The Rally (New Caledonia) politicians
Mayors of places in New Caledonia
Deputies of the 12th National Assembly of the French Fifth Republic
Deputies of the 13th National Assembly of the French Fifth Republic
Senators of New Caledonia
Members of Parliament for New Caledonia